Teyo Johnson (born November 29, 1981) is a Canadian former professional football player who was a tight end in the National Football League (NFL) and the Canadian Football League (CFL). He was drafted by the Oakland Raiders in the second round of the 2003 NFL Draft. He played college football with the Stanford Cardinal.

Johnson was also a member of the NFL's Arizona Cardinals, Miami Dolphins, Denver Broncos and Buffalo Bills and the CFL's Calgary Stampeders. He also played for the Sacramento Mountain Lions of the United Football League.

Early years
Johnson grew up in Lynnwood, Washington and attended Mariner High School in Everett. He transferred to Mira Mesa Senior High School in San Diego, California during his senior year along with friend Amon Gordon, who became an NFL player.

College career
Johnson was recruited to Stanford University as one of the most highly touted two-sport athletes in the country. He aspired to play quarterback, but as he was buried on the depth chart, the coaches switched him to wide receiver to get his talent on the field. In 2001, Johnson was Pac-10 Freshman of the Year at the position of wide receiver.  He racked up 79 catches, 1,032 yards and 15 touchdowns in 22 games. After his sophomore season, when the new coach said he was switching Johnson to yet another position from wide receiver to tight end for next season, he decided to leave school early and enter the NFL draft.

He also played forward for two years on the Stanford basketball team, alongside future NBA players like Josh Childress, Casey Jacobsen, Jason Collins and Jarron Collins.

Professional career

Oakland Raiders
Johnson was drafted with the 63rd pick in the 2003 NFL draft by the Oakland Raiders. In his rookie year he once again changed positions, this time to tight end. He played in all 16 games and made 14 catches for 128 yards and 1 touchdown.

His second season saw him play in only 8 games. He believed that his role was reduced because he missed some voluntary offseason workouts to go to China on an NFL tour, although head coach Norv Turner denied this was the case. Johnson made 9 catches, 131 yards, and 2 touchdowns.

Arizona Cardinals
The start of his third season came with disappointment as he was released by the Raiders at the end of the preseason. He was however quickly signed by the Arizona Cardinals. He only played 6 games for the Cardinals before was once again released. He only made 3 catches for 29 yards in those games.

Recent years
Johnson went to training camp with the Miami Dolphins in 2006 but failed to make the team. While in camp with the Denver Broncos in 2007, he was injured and ended up sitting out that season. Johnson was signed by the Buffalo Bills on January 29, 2008.  He won the 2008 Grey Cup with the Calgary Stampeders.

Early on November 13, 2009, Johnson was stabbed in his rear hip while attending a concert in Calgary.

Personal
Johnson is the younger brother of former NFL and CFL players Ahmani Johnson and Riall Johnson.

References

External links
Stanford Cardinal bio
Just Sports Stats

1981 births
People from White Rock, British Columbia
Sportspeople from British Columbia
Canadian players of American football
Players of American football from San Diego
Players of Canadian football from San Diego
American football tight ends
Stanford Cardinal football players
Stanford Cardinal men's basketball players
Oakland Raiders players
Arizona Cardinals players
Miami Dolphins players
Denver Broncos players
Hamburg Sea Devils players
Buffalo Bills players
Calgary Stampeders players
Living people
Black Canadian players of Canadian football
Sacramento Mountain Lions players
People from Lynnwood, Washington
American men's basketball players
Basketball players from San Diego